International American School of Warsaw (IAS) is a PK–12 private, co-educational, American international school in Warsaw, Poland. It was established in 1989.

References

External links 
 

Warsaw
International schools in Warsaw
Educational institutions established in 1989
1989 establishments in Poland